The Compton Spectrometer and Imager (COSI), is a gamma-ray telescope expected to launch in 2025 as a NASA small astrophysics mission. It is intended to study the recent history of star birth, star death, and the formation of chemical elements in the Milky Way. 

"For more than 60 years, NASA has provided opportunities for inventive, smaller-scale missions to fill knowledge gaps where we still seek answers", said Thomas Zurbuchen, associate administrator for the agency's Science Mission Directorate in Washington, D.C. "COSI will answer questions about the origin of the chemical elements in our own Milky Way galaxy, the very ingredients critical to the formation of Earth itself".

COSI will study gamma rays from radioactive atoms produced when massive stars exploded to map where chemical elements were formed in the Milky Way. The mission will also probe the mysterious origin of our galaxy's positrons, also known as antielectrons – subatomic particles that have the same mass as an electron but a positive charge.

The principal investigator is John Tomsick at the University of California, Berkeley. The mission will cost approximately US$145 million, not including launch costs. NASA will select a launch provider later. The COSI team spent decades developing their technology through flights on scientific balloons. In 2016, they sent a version of the gamma-ray instrument aboard NASA's super pressure balloon, which is designed for long flights and heavy lifts.

NASA's Explorers Program is the agency's oldest continuous program. It provides frequent, low-cost access to space using principal investigator-led space research relevant to the astrophysics and heliophysics programs. Since the 1958 launch of Explorer 1, which discovered Earth's radiation belts, the program has launched more than 90 missions. The Cosmic Background Explorer (COBE), another NASA Explorer mission, led to a Nobel Prize in 2006 for its principal investigators. NASA's Goddard Space Flight Center in Greenbelt, Maryland, manages the program for NASA.

See also 

 Gamma-ray astronomy
 Compton scattering
  Semiconductor detector: Germanium detectors

References

External links 
 Project web site
 How the instrument functions
 The Compton Spectrometer and Imager Astro2020 APC White Paper (Tomsick et al)

Space telescopes
Explorers Program
2025 in spaceflight